The New Zealand women's national rugby sevens team represents New Zealand in the World Rugby Sevens Series, Rugby World Cup Sevens, Summer Olympic Games and the Commonwealth Games.

The team played for the first time at the 1997 Hong Kong Womens Sevens.

They have won 2 World Cups, 6 Womens Rugby Sevens Series, 4 Oceania Women's Sevens Series Championships, 1 Summer Olympic Games competition and 1 Commonwealth Games tournament.

History

Early days
New Zealand did not have any official women's sevens team; they were unofficially represented by the New Zealand Wild Ducks who won the 1997 and 1999 Hong Kong sevens.

The first official New Zealand women’s sevens team was selected in 2000 and was coached by Darryl Suasua. They won the 2000 Hong Kong Sevens after defeating Australia 36–10 in the final.

This team was succeeded by the Aotearoa Māori sevens team which from 2002 to 2007, under coach Peter Joseph unofficially represented New Zealand and won six straight titles at the Hong Kong Sevens.

Go for Gold
In October 2009 the International Olympic Committee agreed by 81 to 8 votes to include Rugby sevens in the Rio Olympics.

Aware that it was important to New Zealand's reputation that they field a competitive team, the decision was made by New Zealand Rugby to establish a high performance woman's sevens squad.
Tony Philp who was responsible for New Zealand Rugby's men’s sevens was allocated NZ$50,000 and assigned the task. Soon after Sean Horan was appointed fulltime coach with support to be provided by the regional sevens resource coaches. The decision was soon made to have the country's 14 national provincial unions host open trials targeted at woman between the ages of 16 and 24 irrespective of whether they had any prior rugby experience. 
The programme was called "Go for Gold" and used the tag "Got what it takes to Go for Gold" in advertising targeted at young woman. Philip was of the opinion that compared with other countries most New Zealand woman even if they had never played the game would have seen a game and thus had an innate understanding of the game and its terminology.

Allan Bunting who had played men's sevens and had started coaching was recruited in 2012 to assist Philp and Horan. In addition to radio, television and print advertising the trio used their contacts to assist with talent spotting. One thousand online applicants were received of whom 800 attended the trials where they were put through various fitness, rugby skills and character assessment activities. Michaela Blyde was made to attend a trial by her mother Cherry who was a former Black Fern. Blyde was heavily involved in playing soccer at the time and was upset when attendance at a second trial meant missing out on a soccer tournament. A naturally talented sportswoman Gayle Broughton had a troubled childhood, which had led to her being expelled at the age of 16 from high school. Her grandmother promised to give her $10 if she would attend a trial. This was enough to tempt her to meet her grandmother the morning after a party and be driven by her to what she thought would be a "dumb trial".
The most promising were reduced to 30 who attended a camp at Waiouru. Among those selected were Shakira Baker, Blyde, Broughton, Huriana Manuel, Carla Hohepa, Linda Itunu and Hazel Tubic who had already represented their country in test rugby while Sarah Hirini had played with Aotearoa Maori and Tyla Nathan-Wong was playing club rugby.
Also at Waiouru were semi-professional netballers Kayla McAlister and Portia Woodman, who without telling their coach had enrolled in the Go for Gold program.

After volunteering at various activities Stu Ross joined the coaching team as an analyst. Emphasis now began on improving the squad members skill level, fitness and nutrition. Training of commenced at provincial academes with squad members only paid when the entire squad assembled.

A squad of 12 (which included Kendra Cocksedge, Hirini, Iruna, Manuel, Nathan-Wong, Tui and Woodman) won the 2012 Oceania Women's Sevens Championship which gained them entry to the 2013 World Cup in Moscow, Russia, which they won.

2012-2013 Seven Series Season
Following the Oceania tournament a squad consisting of Lauren Burgess, Marama Davis, Sarah Hirini, Lavinia Gould, Carla Hohepa, Chyna Hohepa, Linda Itunu, Kayla McAlister, Huriana Manuel, Tyla Nathan Wong, Amanda Rasch and Portia Woodman was selected to complete in the inaugural 2012–13 IRB Women's Sevens World Series.

Captained by Manuel the team won the series following a fourth at Houston and wins at Guangzhou and Amsterdam having scored 169 points and conceded 34.

Because of their potential to win gold at the Olympics, High Performance Sport New Zealand in 2013 provided funding of $800,000 which was increased to $900,000 in 2014.

2013-2014 Seven Series Season
The 2013-2014 season commenced with a loss to Australia in the final of the Dubai Sevens, a win in Atlanta, followed by a runner up in Sao Paolo before the squad won the next six tournaments to win that year’s title.

By 2014 the squad still under the overall direction of head coach Sean Horan had consolidated around two hubs, one at Auckland under Allan Bunting and the other at Mount Maunganui under Cory Sweeney. A few players were located in the Waikato.

2014-2015 Seven Series Season
The 2014-15 season commenced with four wins in a row, at Dubai, Sao Paulo, Atlanta and Langford in Canada before at London they suffered a shock loss to Spain in pool play and they eventually finished fourth. At Amsterdam they lost to the USA team in group play and then lost their quarter final game with England. Their early wins however allowed them to retain the series title and with it gain automatic qualification to the 2016 Summer Olympics in Rio de Janeiro.

Huriana Manuel suffered a serious ankle injury at the 2014 Fifteens World Cup and was replaced as captain by Sarah Hirini.

2015-2016 Seven Series Season
By the start of the 2015-16 season other teams were starting to catch up the team. This coupled with the hub system reducing their off-field connection, conflicts over the style of play between Horan and the players unsettled the team and their performances became inconsistent. Uneven  The season commenced with a loss to Russia in pool play at Dubai and a loss to Australia in the quarter final, Manuel returned in 2016. They were third at Sao Paulo, then runners up at Atlanta and Langford, Australia and England respectively. They were third at Clermont-Ferrand, with Australia winning the season title.

2016 Rio Olympic Games
At the Rio Olympics the team scored 109 points and conceded 12 in pool play before beating USA in the quarter-finals, Great Britain in the semi-finals, but lost 24-17 to Australia in the final. The loss hit the squad hard. Among the members of the team were Shakira Baker, Gayle Broughton, Woodman, Sarah Hirini, Niall Williams, Manuel, Nathan-Wong and Michaela Blyde (who was a travelling reserve).
Broughton ruptured her anterior cruciate ligament (ACL) at the Sao Paulo tournament in February 2016 and after opting for a non-surgical treatment played at Rio without ligaments in the effected knee.

Following Rio Sean Horan resigned as coach.
Allan Bunting and Cory Sweeney both applied for the head coaching position, agreeing that regardless of who got the job, the other would serve as others assistant. In early November 2016 Bunting was appointed as the new head coach with Sweeney as his assistant, while Stu Ross accepted the position of analyst and set-piece coach.

There were changes among the players with Huriana Manuel retiring and Kayla McAlister taking a year away from the game in order to have a child.

Bunting and Sweeney decided to play games using a player lead approach that used space and relentless attack, even from while on defense, a style that they came to term "Kokirikiri". Hirini remained captain and to support her the coaches encouraged other senior players to take on various roles. Once the coaches had set the overall approach for a game Kelly Brazier and Tyla Nathan-Wong would led general performance preparation and direct on field set plays, especially on attack. They also took on Tui and Williams lead the team off field culture and in defense on field. Fluhler and Woodman took responsibility for the squad's Māori culture.
As the team culture developed Māori culture and language began to become more and more integrated into the team. With half the team of Samoan descent, Samoan influence also it also. Fluhler created a team song by writing lyrics to "Te KapaRanpango Takiwhitu" in English which her cousin translated into Maori.

2016-2017 Seven Series Season
The first chance to try the new approach was at Dubai in December 2016 which gave the chance to debut the teenage Tenika Williams and give fringe players Rebekah Tufuga-Corden, Katarina Whata-Simpkins and Jordan Webber a run. With no losses they won their first tournament in more than a year despite being reduced by injuries having only 10 players available for the final. Dubai was the last tournament at which a team member was used to bring water to the on field players after it was observed that the exuberant "chatter" from an injured Niall Williams who was on water-duty ran the risk of giving away too much information to their Australian rivals.

Following on from the success of the 2012 "Go For Gold" talent identification programme, New Zealand Rugby held 18 trials in February 2017 throughout New Zealand to identify potential athletes for the 2020 Tokyo Olympics.
The squad centralized on Tauranga in late 2018.

2017-2018 Seven Series Season
The 2017–18 World Rugby Women's Sevens Series didn’t get off to the best start when at Dubai New Zealand was beaten 14-12 by the USA in the quarter finals, despite having beaten them 45-14 in pool play. This was Kayla McAlister's first tournament after returning from maternity leave. 
In the final of the Sydney Sevens in January 2018 the Black Ferns Sevens were well beaten 31-nil by Australia. This was the last tournament prior to the Gold Coast Commonwealth Games in three months time. After a detailed analysis of what had gone wrong the squad began a fitness training regime designed to allow them to play for a third half.

2018 Gold Coast Commonwealth Games
Just prior to departure for their pre-camp on the Sunshine Coast Kat Whata-Simpkins suffered a hamstring injury, which resulted first in 18 year old Risi Pouri-Lane being added to the travelling team and when it was confirmed that Kat would not recover in time Tenika Willison was promoted to the initial 12. Alena Saili was made a travelling reserve or 13th player with Pouri-Lane staying on as another reserve
Ruby Tui then caught mumps, whose highly contagious nature meant that the whole team had to go into isolation at their Brisbane accommodation.

The competition at the Gold Coast Commonwealth Games held in April 2018 was shorter than normal as there were only eight teams organized into two pools, with the top two teams going forward from each pool.
In the warm-up to the final Broughton's knee accidentally hit Blyde, just above her eye which caused blood to flow from her eyebrow. Within minutes Tyla Nathan-Wong had to be sent to hospital after her neck was injured after accidentally collided with Stacey Fluhler's backside. Willison was promoted to the starting lineup as halfback and Pouri-Lane was promoted to the playing 12.
These issues delayed the start of the game by five minutes
In the final Kelly Brazier scored a runaway 80 metres try in extra time that won the game for New Zealand, while leaving her totally exhausted on the ground.

The return to the uncompleted 2017-2018 season saw the team win the next three tournaments in a row, which was insufficient to overcome the losses at Dubai and Sydney. As a result Australia won the overall series title.

2018-2019 Seven Series Season
New Zealand commenced the 2018–19 World Rugby Women's Sevens Series season with tournament wins at Glendale in Colorado, Dubai and Sydney ended their 37 game winning streak with a 17-all draw to Russia in pool play at Kitakyusha, then in pool play they suffered their first ever a loss to France, before being beaten in the quarter final by USA to finish fifth. The team had commenced the tournament with their coach Bunting on personal leave, Woodman out since October 2018 with a long term Achilles tendon injury, while the central experienced core of the team was decimated by Fitzpatrick, Blyde, Brazier and Broughton not being available, further compounded by Fluhler becoming injured partway through the tournament.
The team rebounded to win the tournament in Canada, before at Biarratz being beaten in the final of the season's last tournament. However they still had accumulated enough points to win the series, while Sarah Hirini became the first woman to play in 200 World Series games.

2018 World Cup
In July 2018 the team won the 2018 Rugby World Cup Sevens – Women's tournament in San Francisco to become women's champion.

The team won the Team of the Year award for 2018 at the Halberg Awards.

2019-2020 Seven Season
The 2019-2020 season began with a third place at Glendale, before tournament wins at Dubai, Cape Town, Hamilton and Sydney, losing only two games across all five of these tournaments. With Woodman still out of commission Fluhler filled her shoes to become the series dominant try scorer. 
Shakira Baker ruptured her ACL in the final at Dubai in December. She was not able to recover in time to be considered for Tokyo.

The onset of the Covid-19 pandemic resulted in the remainder of the season being cancelled. As New Zealand was leading the competition with 783 points scored they were awarded the 2020 series title.

Covid
Due to the international Sevens competition being put on hold the support personnel at the performance base at Mount Manganui was reduced in number with some remaining but on reduced hours. The players had their salaries reduced. The remaining men and women players were organized into a single combined training group in order to form a nucleus of sevens squad overseen by Sweeney, men's coach Clark Laidlaw and men's strength and conditioning coach Blair Mills. Allan Bunting, who had previous been commuting from Auckland stayed in there.
The combining of the two teams had the benefit of exposing the respective sexes to different ways of doing things.
After the initial lockdown life with new Zealand returned to a relative normal in late 2020 as the squad reformed and ways were found to prepare for the Tokyo games were had been rescheduled for 2021. among them were a games against a Moana Pasifika team and a team sourced from members of the Black Ferns fifteens in a mini tournament in Wellington which was termed Pure Sevens.

The opening of the trans-Tasman bubble in May 2021 allowed the playing of six games against Australia at the Orākei Domain in Auckland which was organized to provide two games per day. The Black Sevens won the series 5-1 with Woodman back in top form.
In an effort to replicate playing against team like the USA which had size and speed the team in the first half of 2021 played the Hamilton Boys High School. This school had won the Condor Sevens national school competition sevens times in a row. While rucks were contested it not being a full tackle game, but this didn't prevent Alena Saili fracturing one of her shoulders.

The squad participated in the 2021 Oceania Women's Sevens Championship in Townsville against Australia, Fiji and the Oceania Barbarians. New Zealand won the tournament. This was the final playing chance for players to gain selection before the team would be trimmed to 16 for Tokyo. Kelly Brazier attended the tournament but was unable to play due to flu. She then had a hamstring injury, which put her in doubt for Tokyo. While she wasn’t back to 100% by the end of the tournament she was selected.

2020 Tokyo Olympic Games
in the squad were Michaela Blyde, Shiray Kaka (nee Tane), both of whom had been reserves at Rio.
Tenika Willison was the 13th squad member. Normally while all 13 travel to a tournament only members of the final named 12 are allowed to play, but because of Covid the rules at Tokyo allowed any of the officially named 13 to play, with all of them receiving a medal if the team won one. Willison ended up playing in the game against Great Britain and Russia, in place of Brazier and Blyde respectively.
Terina Te Tamaki and Jazmin Hotham were the travelling reserves.

Sarah Hirini was selected to join Hamish Bond in being New Zealand's flagbearers at the opening ceremony in Tokyo. Due to a racing the next day Bond was replaced by David Nyika.
Due to Covid restrictions on how many could enter the Olympic Village at a time eleven of the players and management including Hirini were due to fly from Townsville in order to ensure Hirini would be able to attend the opening ceremony. They would be joined later by the rest of the team.
After their first flight was cancelled the eleven missed their connection in Brisbane, which led to their 24-hour pre-departure tests expiring.  Eventually a way was found of getting Hirani accompanied by Woodman to Tokyo in time to participate in the opening ceremony.

New Zealand beat Kenya. In the next pool game Great Britain raced to a 21-nil lead before being beaten 26-21. They then beat Russia 33-0 and then beat them again in the quarter final 36-0.

In the semi-final the Black Ferns were faced by an much improved Fiji, who up until that time had never beaten New Zealand. Within 90 seconds Broughton scored for New Zealand to give a 5- nil lead. Fiji answered with a try by Vasiti Solikoviti to lead 7-5 at half-time. Resumption of the game after half-time saw Solikoviti score another  try to increase the lead to 15-5. Nathan-Wong then equalized with a try under the goal posts. Fluhler scored what was an unconverted try before Fiji scored in the corner to equalize, but Viniana Riwai was unable to convert the try. With the score drawn at 17-all the game was forced into extra time, during which Broughton who had been bought back onto the field to replace Brazier scored the winning try. The final score in favour of the Black Ferns was 22-17.

The team then beat France in the final 26-12 after leading 19-5 at halftime.

In June 2022 New Zealand hosted and won the 2022 Pacific Four Series.

2022 Birmingham Commonwealth Games
The team competed in the rugby sevens tournament at the 2022 Commonwealth Games. After topping their pool unbeaten, the team lost their semi-final match against Australia 12-17 and eventually won the bronze medal in the playoff against Canada for third, 19-12.

Records

Rugby World Cup Sevens 
The Black Ferns Sevens have competed in all four World Cup Sevens for the Women's, and have made the final in all 4 tournaments. They have won 2 World Cups and have been runners-up twice.

Summer Olympics
New Zealand have played in 2 Summer Olympic Tournaments and have made the final in both competitions, but have a split record of 1-1.

Commonwealth Games
The Black Ferns Sevens have played in 2 Commonwealth Games Sevens Tournaments. They have made the Final once and would go on to win that tournament but lost in the Semi-Finals in the next one before placing 3rd overall.

Oceania Women's Sevens Championship 
New Zealand have been the Oceania Women's Sevens Champions 4 times, while they have been runners-up 2 times and have been 3rd placed two times aswell. They did not compete in the 2015 and 2016 tournaments, and also in 2020 which was cancelled due to the Covid-19 pandemic.

Women's Sevens Series 
The Black Ferns Sevens have dominated the Womens Sevens Series by winning 6 out of the 9 tournaments, and have been runners-up twice before placing 5th in a disrupted 2021-22 season. The 2020-21 season was cancelled due to the Covid-19 pandemic.

Players

Current squad
Squad named for the 2023 World Rugby HSBC Sevens Series in Vancouver from the 3–5 March.

Caps updated to the latest date: 5 March 2023

Notable players

Kelly Brazier
Stacey Fluhler 
Lavinia Gould
Victoria Grant
Honey Hireme
Sarah Hirini
Carla Hohepa
Linda Itunu
Kayla McAlister
Huriana Manuel
Tyla Nathan-Wong
Hannah Porter
Hazel Tubic
Ruby Tui
Renee Wickliffe
Niall Williams
Selica Winiata
Portia Woodman

Player Records
The following shows leading career New Zealand players based on performance in the World Rugby Women's Sevens Series.

Players in bold are still active

Coaches

Notes

References

External links
 
 WorldRugby profile

|-

|-

Sevens
Women's national rugby sevens teams
Women's
World Rugby Women's Sevens Series core teams